Nick Thuillier (5 May 1907 – 25 June 1983) was an Irish fencer. He competed in the individual and team foil events at the 1948 Summer Olympics.

References

External links
 

1907 births
1983 deaths
Irish male foil fencers
Olympic fencers of Ireland
Fencers at the 1948 Summer Olympics
20th-century Irish people